Franciszek Siarczyński (1758–1829) was a Polish Roman Catholic priest, member of the Piarist religious order, historian, geographer, teacher, writer and publicist.

He was a lecturer of grammar, history and geography at the Collegium Nobilium in Warsaw, Poland from 1781 to 1785.
He was a regular guest at the Thursday Dinners held by the King of Poland, Stanisław August Poniatowski in the era of the Enlightenment in Poland. He was the author of three volumes of ‘Geografii, czyli opisania naturalnego, historycznego i politycznego krajów i narodów’ (Geography, natural history, history and politics of the country and its citizens).

At the time of the Kościuszko Uprising in 1794, he wrote for the Gazeta Wolna Warszawska (The Free Warsaw newspaper).

He collected material for the Słownika historyczno-statystyczno-geograficznego Galicji (The Encyclopædia of history, statistics and geography of Galicia), which was published in parts from 1857 as a weekly supplement ‘Rozmaitościach’ in the Lwów Gazette: Gazeta Lwowska.

After the transfer of the Ossoliński family's collection of books, from Vienna to Lwów, in 1827, he became the first director of the National Library of the Ossolineum, from 1827 to 1829.

His religious posts included being the Parish Priest in Jarosław, the Cathedral Canon in Warsaw and Przemyśl and the Prior in Kozieniec (1789) and Łańcut (1799).

References
Parts translated from the Polish version of this page from Polish Wikipedia on 03.11.2008
Notes

1758 births
1829 deaths
Polish Roman Catholics
Polish Roman Catholic priests
Polish male writers
Piarists